Pakotal may refer to:
 Pakotal, North Khorasan
 Pakotal, Razavi Khorasan